Jeffrey Mathebula (born 22 June 1979) is a South African professional boxer who competed from 2001 to 2013. He held the IBF junior featherweight title in 2012.

Amateur career
Mathebula competed for his native country at the 2000 Summer Olympics in Sydney in the Men's Featherweight division, where he defeated Noureddine Madjhoud in the first round and lost to Bekzat Sattarkhanov in the second round. He finished his amateur career with a record of 101–4.

Professional career
Mathebula made his professional debut on 17 February 2001, and has been managed and trained by Nick Durandt and promoted by Branco Sports Promotions. He fought to a draw with Malcolm Klassen in a six-round bout in Temba, North West in September 2004.

Mathebula defeated Julio Zarate via a unanimous decision with the scores of 117–109 twice and 118–109 in an IBF super bantamweight title eliminator in Temba on 29 August 2008, after knocking him down twice in the tenth-round. He was supposed to challenge the then IBF super bantamweight champion Steve Molitor, but Molitor lost to Celestino Caballero. Hence, Mathebula fought against Caballero for the WBA Super World and IBF World super bantamweight title. However, he lost his first world title shot against Caballero via a split decision at the Roberto Duran Arena in Panama on 30 April 2009.

After losing to Takalani Ndlovu via a split decision in an IBF junior featherweight title eliminator in Brakpan, Gauteng in September 2010, Mathebula defeated Ndlovu via a split decision in their rematch in Brakpan to be crowned the IBF junior featherweight champion. It was the SABC-televised first boxing event after one year interruption.

Mathebula v. Donaire
In one of the more defining and memorable fights, Mathebula fought the hard-hitting, WBO Super Bantamweight Champion Nonito Donaire (29–1 18 KO's). Donaire is rated by The Ring as the number five pound-for-pound boxer in the world. It was a unification fight for IBF and WBO Super Bantamweight belts. The bout was Live on HBO Boxing After Dark on 7 July 2012 at The Home Depot Center in Carson, California. Donaire defeated Methebula by unanimous decision. Donaire knocked Mathebula down in round four, breaking his jaw in two places.

Professional boxing record

References

External links
 

1979 births
Living people
People from Collins Chabane Local Municipality
Tsonga people
Boxers at the 2000 Summer Olympics
Olympic boxers of South Africa
Featherweight boxers
Super-bantamweight boxers
World super-bantamweight boxing champions
International Boxing Federation champions
World boxing champions
South African male boxers
Sportspeople from Limpopo